Makrem Missaoui (born 14 February 1981) is a Tunisian handball player for CS Dinamo București and the Tunisian national team.

He participated on the Tunisia men's national handball team at the 2016 Summer Olympics in Rio de Janeiro, in the men's handball tournament.

References

External links

1981 births
Living people
Tunisian male handball players
CS Dinamo București (men's handball) players
Olympic handball players of Tunisia
Handball players at the 2016 Summer Olympics
Sportspeople from Tunis
Expatriate handball players 
Tunisian expatriate sportspeople in Romania
Competitors at the 2018 Mediterranean Games
Mediterranean Games silver medalists for Tunisia
Mediterranean Games medalists in handball